The 2020 Chile Open (also known as the Chile Dove Men+Care Open for sponsorship reasons) was a men's tennis tournament played on outdoor clay courts. It was the 22nd edition of the Chile Open (the first since 2014), and part of the ATP 250 of the 2020 ATP Tour. It took place in Santiago, Chile from 24 February through 1 March 2020. Unseeded Thiago Seyboth Wild, who entered on a wildcard, won the singles title.

Singles main draw entrants

Seeds 

 Rankings are as of February 17, 2020.

Other entrants 
The following players received wildcards into the singles main draw:
  Marcelo Tomás Barrios Vera 
  Thiago Seyboth Wild 
  Alejandro Tabilo 

The following players received entry from the qualifying draw:
  Filip Horanský 
  Martin Kližan
  Renzo Olivo 
  Carlos Taberner

The following player received entry as a lucky loser:
  Juan Pablo Varillas

Withdrawals 
Before the tournament
  Borna Ćorić → replaced by  Jozef Kovalík
  Laslo Đere → replaced by  Andrej Martin
  Nicolás Jarry → replaced by  Federico Coria
  Corentin Moutet → replaced by  Leonardo Mayer
  Guido Pella → replaced by  Juan Pablo Varillas
  Diego Schwartzman → replaced by  Paolo Lorenzi
  Fernando Verdasco → replaced by  Salvatore Caruso

Retirements 
  Cristian Garín

Doubles main draw entrants

Seeds 

 Rankings are as of February 17, 2020.

Other entrants 
The following pairs received wildcards into the doubles main draw:
  Marcelo Tomás Barrios Vera /  Alejandro Tabilo
  Gonzalo Lama /  Thiago Seyboth Wild

Champions

Singles 

  Thiago Seyboth Wild def.  Casper Ruud, 7–5, 4–6, 6–3

Doubles 

  Roberto Carballés Baena /  Alejandro Davidovich Fokina def.  Marcelo Arévalo /  Jonny O'Mara, 7–6(7–3), 6–1

References

External links 
 

Chile Open
Chile Open (tennis)
Chile Open
Chile Open
Chile Open